Spring Grove Township is a township in Linn County, Iowa.

History
Spring Grove Township was organized in 1853.

References

Townships in Linn County, Iowa
Townships in Iowa
1853 establishments in Iowa
Populated places established in 1853